Lawrence James Delaney (11 June 1883 – 8 September 1946) was an Australian rules footballer who played with St Kilda in the Victorian Football League (VFL).

References

External links 

1883 births
1946 deaths
Australian rules footballers from Victoria (Australia)
St Kilda Football Club players